Donegal Investment Group has operations in Ireland, Britain, the Netherlands and Brazil. Its chief executive is in Ireland.

Donegal Investment Group specialises in the production and sale of seed potatoes and organic produce for the Irish and British markets and is listed on the Irish Stock Exchange. It is also known for its line of Daisi products, Daisi being the name of the cow who features on the milk the company sells.

Donegal Investment Group sold its Donegal Creameries dairy processing operations and retail division to Aurivo Co-operative Society Limited, then known as Connacht Gold, in 2011.

See also
 List of companies listed on the Irish Stock Exchange

References

External links
 Official website

Companies listed on Euronext Dublin
County Donegal
Dairy products companies of Ireland
Demutualized organizations